William James Gray (1874 – 1960) was an eminent Anglican clergyman in the mid 20th century.

Gray was educated at the London College of Divinity. After curacies in Brixton and Beckenham he was Vicar of Ide Hill and Chaplain to Sevenoaks Workhouse and Infirmary from  1911 to 1915. He was the incumbent at St Nicholas with St Clement, Rochester from 1915 to 1942; Rural Dean of Rochester from 1925 to 40; Archdeacon of Tonbridge from 1940 to 1953; and Vicar of Kippington from 1942 to 1952.   He retired in 1953 and died on 17 September 1960.

References

1874 births
1960 deaths
Alumni of the London College of Divinity
Archdeacons of Tonbridge